The 1974 Skate Canada International was held in Kitchener, Ontario on October 24–26. Medals were awarded in the disciplines of men's singles, ladies' singles, and ice dancing.

Results

Men

Ladies

Ice dancing

References

1974 in figure skating
Skate Canada International
1974 in Canadian sports 
1974 in Ontario
October 1974 sports events in Canada